Gyula Juhász (4 April 1883, Szeged – 6 April 1937, Szeged) was a Hungarian poet, who was awarded the Baumgarten Prize.

Between 1902 and 1906 he was a student of the University of Budapest, where he met Mihály Babits and Dezső Kosztolányi.

Throughout his life, Juhász made multiple suicide attempts. He eventually died after overdosing on his headache relief medicine, in 1937.

1883 births
1937 deaths
People from Szeged
Hungarian male poets
Eötvös Loránd University alumni
19th-century Hungarian poets
19th-century Hungarian male writers
Baumgarten Prize winners
1937 suicides